Nazareth is a neighbourhood (barrio) of Asunción, Paraguay. It is a relatively new neighborhood that arose from the need for an expansion of Asunción. Its origin dates back to the 1930s.

Population 
The neighbourhood Nazareth has a total of 7,133 inhabitants, 45.7% male and 54.3% female. The population density is approximately 5,780 people/km2.

Climate 
Nazareth has a tropical climate. The average temperature is 28°C in the summer, and 19°C in the winter. The prevailing winds are North and South. The average annual rainfall is 1700 mm.

References 
 The neighborhoods of Asunción . Edited by the Municipality of Asunción
 Geography of Paraguay . Editorial Aramí Grupo Empresarial

Neighbourhoods of Asunción